The Reinsurance Treaty was a diplomatic agreement between the German Empire and the Russian Empire that was in effect from 1887 to 1890. Only a handful of top officials in Berlin and St. Petersburg knew of its existence since it was top secret. The treaty played a critical role in German Chancellor Otto von Bismarck's extremely complex and ingenious network of alliances and agreements, which aimed to keep the peace in Europe and to maintain Germany's economic, diplomatic and political dominance. It helped keep the peace for both Russia and Germany.

The treaty provided that both parties would remain neutral if the other became involved in a war with a third great power, but that would not apply if Germany attacked France or if Russia attacked Austria-Hungary.  Germany paid for Russian friendship by agreeing to the Russian sphere of influence in Bulgaria and Eastern Rumelia (now part of southern Bulgaria) and by agreeing to support Russian action to keep the Black Sea as its own preserve. After Bismarck lost power in 1890, his enemies in the Foreign Ministry convinced the Kaiser that the treaty was too much in Russia's favor and should not be renewed. The cancellation like the treaty itself remained a top secret. Russia however wanted the protections it afforded, and was angry at the termination. Needing allies, Russia opened negotiations with Germany's enemy France. The resulting Franco-Russian Alliance of 1891–1892 to 1917 rapidly began to take shape. Historians consider it a major disaster for Germany, and one of the long-term causes of the First World War.

Background
The Reinsurance Treaty originated after the German-Austrian-Russian Dreikaiserbund (League of the Three Emperors) had lapsed in 1887 because of competition between Austria-Hungary and Russia for spheres of influence in the Balkans. In early 1887, a Russian diplomat went to Berlin to propose a treaty in which Russia would be a friendly neutral during a war between Germany and France, and in return, Germany would recognise Russian dominance in Bulgaria and promise a friendly neutrality if Russia seized the Turkish Straits from the Ottoman Empire. Bismarck strongly supported the idea, but Alexander III rejected the plan until Foreign Minister Nikolay Girs convinced him that to be best for Russia in the absence of French friendship. Bismarck refused Russia's request for Germany to stay neutral if Russia went to war against Austria and explained that Berlin had an ironclad Triple Alliance with Vienna.

Bismarck had a long-term policy of preserving the peace in Europe, which was threatened by the growing competition between Russia and Austria–Hungary for dominance over the Balkans. He felt that an agreement with Russia was essential to prevent a Russian alliance with France, and he always had the policy of keeping France isolated diplomatically to avoid Germany from fighting a two-front war against both France and Russia. Bismarck risked the expansion of the Russian sphere of influence toward the Mediterranean and diplomatic tensions with Vienna.

The treaty signed by Bismarck and Russian Foreign Minister Nikolay Girs had two parts:
 Germany and Russia agreed to observe benevolent neutrality if either become involved in a war with a third country. If Germany attacked France or if Russia attacked Austria-Hungary, that provision would not apply. In those cases, the distinguished bilateral alliances could come into effect. The Reinsurance Treaty applied only if France or Austria-Hungary were the aggressors.
 In the most secret completion protocol, Germany would declare neutrality if Russia intervened against the Ottoman control of the Bosphorus and the Dardanelles.

Nonrenewal
As part of Bismarck's system of "periphery diversion", the treaty was highly dependent on his prestige. After Kaiser Wilhelm II removed Bismarck from office in 1890, Russia asked for a renewal of the treaty, but Germany refused. Bismarck's successor, Leo von Caprivi, felt no need to mollify Russia. German foreign policy establishment was unanimous in rejecting a renewal because the treaty contradicted so many other German positions with regard to Austria, Britain, Romania and Italy. For example, the Reinsurance Treaty contradicted the secret treaty of 1883 in which Germany and Austria promised to protect Romania, and Russia knew nothing of that treaty.

Kaiser Wilhelm II, still highly influential in foreign policy, believed that his personal friendship with Tsar Alexander III would suffice to ensure further genial diplomatic ties. His higher priority was to build better relationships with Britain. Anglo-Russian relations had long been strained by Russia's quest to take control of the Turkish Straits, which link the Black Sea and the Mediterranean. Britain feared that Russian expansion to its south would threaten British colonial interests in the Middle East. France, desperate for an ally, offered financial help to rebuild the Russian economy and successfully developed the Franco-Russian Alliance in 1894, which ended French isolation. The dismissal of Bismarck, the erratic temper of Wilhelm II and the uncertain policy of the men who succeeded Bismarck were joint causes of a growing international instability.

In 1896, the retired Bismarck caused a huge sensation by revealing the existence of the treaty to a German newspaper. He blamed his successor, Caprivi, as responsible for the nonrenewal in 1890. Bismarck said that the failure of the treaty made it possible for France and Russia to draw together.  

Most historians, says Norman Rich, agree that the Reinsurance Treaty itself was not of great importance while it was in operation, but the failure to renew it marked the decisive turning point of Russia's movement away from Germany and toward France and so was one of the Causes of World War I, which broke out in 1914.  Sidney Fay agrees that it was a turning point but also argues that nonrenewal was only one of several powerful factors pushing Russia and Germany apart. The German treaty with Britain in July 1890 made the Russians suspect falsely that Berlin was drawing closer to London. Secondly, Pan-Slavism was growing in Russia, with a determination to dominate the Balkans. As a result Russia and Austria increasingly became alienated from each other, and Germany had to support its only true ally Austria. A third factor was the renewal of revanchism in France, making the French much more eager to find an alliance with Russia, despite its extreme hostility toward Republicanism.

See also
 Austro–Serbian Alliance of 1881
 International relations (1814–1919)

References

Further reading
 Sempell, Charlotte. “The Constitutional and Political Problems of the Second Chancellor, Leo Von Caprivi.” Journal of Modern History 25#3 (1953), pp. 234–54 online.
 Eyck, Erich. Bismarck and the German empire (1968) pp 289–98.
 Kennan, George Frost. The Decline of Bismarck's European Order (Princeton UP, 1981) pp. 462, 254-408 passim. online
 Rich, Norman. Great power diplomacy, 1814-1914 (1992) pp 244–62
 Taylor, A.J.P. The Struggle for Mastery in Europe, 1848-1918. (1954) pp 316–19.

Foreign relations of the German Empire
Foreign relations of the Russian Empire
Secret treaties
World War I treaties
Germany–Russia relations
1887 treaties
Treaties of the Russian Empire
Otto von Bismarck
1887 in Germany
1887 in the Russian Empire
Reinsurance
Treaties of the German Empire
Bilateral treaties of Russia